The 2006 Texas State Bobcats football team was an American football team that represented Texas State University–San Marcos (now known as Texas State University) during the 2006 NCAA Division I FCS football season as a member of the Southland Conference (SLC). In their third year under head coach David Bailiff, the team compiled an overall record of 5–6 with a mark of 3–3 in conference play.

Schedule

References

Southwest Texas State
Texas State Bobcats football seasons
Southwest Texas State Bobcats football